Football Manager 2006 (also known as Worldwide Soccer Manager 2006 in North America) is a 2005 football management simulation game. FM2006 was the second game in the Football Manager series. It is available for PC, Mac, and PSP platforms and was released in the United Kingdom on 21 October 2005. On the same day as the game's release, Sports Interactive also released a patch to fix some bugs discovered during the Beta and Gold stages of development. In its first week of release, it became the second-fastest-selling PC game of all-time in the UK. It was also the first game in the  series to be released on an Xbox console. In April 2006, an Xbox 360 version was released. It was succeeded by Football Manager 2007.

Gameplay
FM06 features similar gameplay to that of the Football Manager series. Gameplay consists of taking charge of a professional association football team, as the team manager. Players can sign football players to contracts, manage finances for the club, and give team talks to players. FM06 is a simulation of real world management, with the player being judged on various factors by the club's AI owners and board.

FM06 adjusts some gameplay that was found in the original football manager release. These adjustments include team-talks, simplified training and in-game help screens. As has been customary with the series a beta demo of the game was released on 12 September 2005. This was later followed on 30 September by a gold demo. This is a cut-down, limited time version of the full game which is sent to the game manufacturers.

Additional leagues
Football Manager 2006 contains the same playable leagues as its predecessor, but with 2 small additions. The French league now has a fourth viewable but unplayable level (the CFA division), and the structural change to the Swedish league involving the re-instatement of Division One has been implemented, with Division Two retained as a playable fourth level.

Harchester United
Fictional team Harchester United from the Sky One drama series, Dream Team were included in FM06 as an Easter Egg. This option comes in the form of a text file, placed in the game's directory.

Reception

Football Manager 2006 computer version received a "Platinum" sales award from the Entertainment and Leisure Software Publishers Association (ELSPA), indicating sales of at least 300,000 copies in the United Kingdom.

Worldwide Soccer Manager 2006 was a runner-up for Computer Games Magazines list of the top 10 computer games of 2005.

See also
 Championship Manager 2006

References

 EuroGamer.net review of Football Manager 2006
 TrustedReviews.com review of Football Manager 2006

External links
 

2005 video games
2006
Classic Mac OS games
Multiplayer online games
MacOS games
PlayStation Portable games
Video games developed in the United Kingdom
Windows games
Xbox 360 games
Multiplayer and single-player video games